Caesars Golf Macau is a golf course in Cotai, Macau, China . Formerly known as the Orient Golf (Macau) Club, Harrah's Entertainment (later Caesars Entertainment) purchased the  property during the casino boom in 2007. Harrah's later renamed it Caesars Golf.

In 2013, Caesars sold the golf course to Pearl Dynasty Investments for $438 million.

See also
 Sport in Macau
 Cotai Strip

References

External links

1978 establishments in Macau